The  Washington Redskins season was the franchise's 63rd season in the National Football League (NFL) and their 58th in Washington, D.C.

The Redskins' 3–13 season was the worst record the team had posted since 1961, and the fewest wins they have ever gained in a 16-game season, an ignominy later  matched by their 2013 and 2019 seasons. The team was decimated by the onset of the modern salary cap and free agency system.  The Redskins were forced to depend on younger and untested players at many key positions.

The season marked the hiring of head coach Norv Turner, who would spend the next six seasons coaching the Redskins.

In addition to going winless at RFK in 1994, Turner's first season in Washington saw the team lose at home to the Falcons for the first time.  Prior to the Falcons' 27–20 victory in Week 4, Atlanta had been 0–10 against the Redskins at RFK. This included a 24–7 loss to the Redskins during Washington's most recent championship season.

Offseason

NFL Draft

Personnel

Staff

Roster

Regular season
The Redskins not only finished with the second worst record in 1994 at 3–13, just behind the 2–14 Oilers, but also suffered their worst 16–game season in terms of wins, although this would later be tied in 2013 and 2019. The Redskins suffered nine of their thirteen defeats by less than a full touchdown and only the two defeats to the Dallas Cowboys came by more than 20 points. All three of the Redskins' wins are on the road; the team failed to win a home game all season, going 0–8 when playing at RFK, including their biggest low point, losing to Atlanta for their first ever home loss to that team in eleven games. The Redskins also went 0–8 in division games: their three wins comprised two against NFC West rivals and one against the Colts. This would be Norv Turner's first of seven season's coaching the Redskins.

Schedule

Standings

References

Washington
Washington Redskins seasons
Red